Harry Orbell (4 November 1860 – 27 March 1914) was a British trade unionist.

Born in Bethnal Green on 4 November 1860, Henry Joseph (Harry) Orbell trained as a writing desk maker, but was unable to find sufficient work, and so instead found employment at a tea warehouse, repairing tea chests.  In 1887, there was a proposal to reduce wages of workers at the warehouse, and Orbell helped organise a meeting in opposition to this.  The meeting founded the Tea Operatives' and General Labourers' Association, with Orbell becoming its president.

The union played a key role in the London Dock strike of 1889, with Orbell leading strike action at the nearby Tilbury Docks.  He kept the strike solid there, in part by sending trade unionists to infiltrate groups of workers unwittingly recruited to break the strike, then getting the unionists to leaflet the new workers, informing them of their situation, and requesting that they return to London.

Following the strike, the union grew dramatically in size and became the Dock, Wharf, Riverside and General Labourers' Union, with Orbell as one of two full-time national organisers (alongside Tom McCarthy).  Orbell initially travelled to the Netherlands, where he founded branches in Amsterdam and Rotterdam.  Later, he was based in London, but regularly travelled the country, and was one of the first to spot Ernest Bevin's talents, successfully recommending him to Ben Tillett for a full-time post.

Orbell was one of the main organisers of the successful 1911 Liverpool general transport strike.  The following year, he advised against transport workers in London holding a strike; the workers voted for strike action and Orbell then supported them, but the ten-week strike was ultimately unsuccessful.  Already in poor health, the strain of this worsened his condition and although he recovered for a while, he became ill again in late 1913 and died in March 1914.

Although Orbell never stood for political office, he supported the Labour Party, and served for some years on its National Executive Committee.  He also served on the Port of London Authority.

References

1860 births
1914 deaths
English trade unionists
People from Bethnal Green
Presidents of British trade unions